Berczik Árpád  (8 July 1842 in Temesvár – 16 July 1919 in Budapest) was a Hungarian writer.

He studied laws and worked for the administration, Kisfaludy Társaság (1873) and  Borsszem Jankó. He published his writings in publications such as Pesti Napló (1870–72), but he is mainly known for his theatrical plays.

Works
Az igmándi kispap, (1881);
Nézd meg az anyját (Bp., 1883);
A Protekció (Bp., 1885);
Himfy dalai (1898)
Színművei (I-V., 1912)

References
Kozma Andor: B. Á. emlékezete (MTA Emlékbeszédek, Bp., 1921);
Berczik Árpád: B. Á. (Bp., 1933);
Molnár Pál: B. Á. a drámaíró (Bp., 1936).
Magyar Életrajzi Lexikon

External links
 

1842 births
1919 deaths
Hungarian writers